Daniel Alexandre Morales Batagello (born 6 December 1975 in Brazil) is a Brazilian former footballer, who typically played as a defensive midfielder, and now manager.

Playing career
After spending the first nine years of his career in his home country with XV de Jau, Mogi Mirim, Fernandópolis, Garça FC and Coritiba, Morales relocated to Bulgaria in December 2002, signing a contract with Naftex Burgas. During playing at Brazil Morales earned 200 appearances, scored twenty goals. He made his competitive debut for Naftex on 15 March 2003 against Cherno More Varna in the seventeen round of the Bulgarian top division. In the next season (2003–04), Morales earned 27 appearances playing in the A Group, scored six goals and provided seven assists. On 13 February 2004 he scored two goals and provided one assist in a match against Bulgarian champions CSKA Sofia. The result of the match was a 3-3 draw.

In June 2004 Daniel joined the defended A Group champions Lokomotiv Plovdiv for a fee of 100 000 €. He wears shirt number twenty-eight for Loko. Morales made his debut for Loko Plovdiv on 15 August 2004 against his previous team Naftex.

In season 2004/05 he played in only 9 matches and in summer'2005 signed with Cherno More Varna. Morales fast becomes part of the starting team of Cherno More. The Brazilian player is uncompromising in defense and very dangerous in attack. In December 2006 he was honored as Footballer of the Year of Varna. One month later he transferred to the most successful Bulgarian football team - CSKA Sofia. For six months in CSKA Morales earned 10 appearances playing in the A PFG, scoring one goal. In season 2007/08 he played in Lokomotiv Plovdiv. On 3 August 2008 Morales signed a one-and-a-half year contract with Spartak Varna. In the season 2008-09 he earned 27 appearances playing in the A Group, scored seven goals and provided two assists. In June 2009 Morales signed with Lokomotiv Mezdra, where he retired after a season.

Managerial career
From 2010 to 2011 he was scout in Chernomorets Burgas. In October 2010 he founded his own youth academy in Burgas. From 2013 Morales works at Litex as youth coach, before moving to the CSKA Sofia academy in 2016, after the take over of Grisha Ganchev.

CSKA Sofia

Yourth coach and assistant role
On 27 November 2016, following the resignation of Edward Iordănescu, Stamen Belchev was appointed as interim manager of CSKA Sofia, while Morales was announces as his assistant. On 3 January 2017 both were confirmed to become a permanent manager and assistant of the team. Between 2016 and 2008 Morales was again manager of youth sectors of the team, before Lyuboslav Penev appointment as manager of CSKA Sofia for a third time on 8 February 2019 on whom Daniem become an assistant. He was later assistant under Dobromir Mitov and Stamen Belchev.

Caretaker role and assistance under Akrapović
In November 2021 Morales was announced as an interim manager of CSKA. He led the team in 4 matches, 2 of them in the Europa League against Roma and Young Boys. After Bruno Akrapović was announced as the new manager of the team on 11 November 2021, he once again stepped down as an assistant.

On 2 April 2021, after 5 years in CSKA Sofia, Morales left the club due to mutual agreement.

Head coach
On 9 June 2021, Morales was announced as the new manager of Bulgarian First League team of Botev Vratsa. On 10 June 2022 he was announced as the new manager of CSKA 1948 III.

Managerial statistics

Personal life
In April 2009, he received a Bulgarian passport, having also Brazilian and Italian passports.

References

External links
 Brazilian FA Database
 Profile at spartak1918.com

1975 births
Living people
Brazilian footballers
Esporte Clube XV de Novembro (Jaú) players
Mogi Mirim Esporte Clube players
Fernandópolis Futebol Clube players
Coritiba Foot Ball Club players
Neftochimic Burgas players
PFC Lokomotiv Plovdiv players
PFC Cherno More Varna players
PFC CSKA Sofia players
PFC Spartak Varna players
PFC Lokomotiv Mezdra players
First Professional Football League (Bulgaria) players
Brazilian expatriate sportspeople in Bulgaria
Expatriate footballers in Bulgaria
Footballers from São Paulo (state)
Association football midfielders
People from Jaú